The 2016–17 Israeli Noar Premier League was the 23rd season since its introduction in 1994 as the top-tier football in Israel for teenagers between the ages 18–20, and the 6th under the name Noar Premier League.

League table

References

External links

Israeli Noar Premier League seasons
Youth